Events from the year 1772 in Canada.

Incumbents
Monarch: George III

Governors
Governor of the Province of Quebec: Guy Carleton
Governor of Nova Scotia: Lord William Campbell
Commodore-Governor of Newfoundland: John Byron
Governor of St. John's Island: Walter Patterson

Events
 Samuel Hearne explores Coppermine River to Arctic Ocean.
 HBC Mathey Cocking, to Blackfeet country west of Eagle Hills.
 The Hudson's Bay Company opens Cumberland House on the Saskatchewan River.
 James Cook and George Vancouver explore the northwest coast of America.
 The Yorkshire emigration begins with the arrival of 62 passengers aboard The Duke of York.

Births

Deaths
 September 30: Jean-Louis Le Loutre, priest, Spiritan, and missionary (born 1709)

Historical documents
Solicitor General suggests rules affecting government, religion (including Jesuits), property and justice, as well as agreements under French regime

With no Quebec "plan of laws" submitted, former attorney general Francis Maseres says "every thing relating to that province seems to be in suspense"

Nearly 60 Quebec City "subscribers" agree to weigh Portugal gold coins received and deduct uniform amount from value of any that have been debased

Dangerous fire spreading from Quebec City seminary is stopped by effectiveness of garrison soldiers, well-supplied "engines" and alert citizens

Soldier of 52nd Regiment warns public not to accommodate his wife, "Eloped[...]and, as I am inform'd, is living with[...]a Soldier in the 60th Regiment"

Musician Guillaume de Vaut-Court of Paris, performing in Upper-Town, retails his compositions of "Simple Counter-point" and music for concerts to hire

Liverpool couple Deborah Cuffy, "negro free woman," and Irishman John Carroll told by magistrates to "take each other in our presence, which they did"

Notice that Black woman named "Thursday" is missing in Halifax, where "her Master" John Rock offers $2 reward plus costs for her return

Quebecker will teach "Small Sword, Cut & Thrust, after the best completest manner," as well as French and "Dancing after the newest and best Mode"

Because of limited transportation in region of Campobello and Passamaquoddy, justices of the peace to hold semi-annual general sessions court there

Molyneux Shuldham governor of Newfoundland and Labrador from Hudson Strait to St.-Jean River near Anticosti Island, plus it and Magdalen Islands

Inuit in London stunned at first, but "admiration increased in proportion" to their understanding of "the use, beauty, and mechanism of what they saw"

"Tumbling over each other in glorious confusion" - George Cartwright plays games with Inuit in Labrador, including threading-the-needle and leapfrog

William Johnson satisfies Mississaugas after they complain about "David Ramsey, an Indian trader," who killed several of their people near Niagara

Detroit commandant Philip Dejean praised for "unwearied endeavours" to bring confessed killer of merchant at Detroit to face justice in Quebec City

"Indian Leaders" retain respect of both Hudson's Bay Company and Indigenous people with displays of influence and bouts of intensive begging

"She built the hut in which we found her" - Resourceful Dogrib woman survives alone for months after escaping Athabascans (Note: "savages" used)

"Had the vanity to think that I could have kept pace" - Snowshoe speedster Samuel Hearne is no match for swiftness of bison running in deep snow

Royal Society member notes Hudson Bay sturgeon, burbot, "gwiniad" (called "tickomeg" locally) "and a new fish called the Sucker at Hudson's Bay"

"New voyage which is intended to be made to the South Seas" is expected to throw new light on discovery of Northwest Passage

References 

Canada
72